Our Land (also known as The Earth) is a 2006 Italian comedy-drama film written and directed by Sergio Rubini. The film was nominated for seven David di Donatello awards (including best film and best director), and for three Nastro d'Argento awards.

Plot summary 
Luigi Di Santo is a respectable teacher in Milan, where he lives his family, with a bad past in Apulia. One day he is called to Mesagne to deal with family problems. One of his three brothers does not want to surrender his farm in the country to a local developer who wants to build a large out-of-town shopping mall on the land. Another of the brothers, Michele, is desperate for his brother to sell the farm, because he has big debts and does not want to compromise his political career. Finally, the third and youngest of the brothers, Aldo, manages a retreat for disabled people in the country, and looks absolutely harmless. On the night of the Good Friday procession, the developer is shot dead in the town square, and people believe the killer is Mario, the owner of the farm, to take revenge. But it is not so, and soon Luigi finds a terrible secret in his family.

Cast 

 Fabrizio Bentivoglio: Luigi Di Santo
 Sergio Rubini: Tonino
 Emilio Solfrizzi: Michele Di Santo
 Paolo Briguglia: Mario Di Santo
 Claudia Gerini: Laura
 Massimo Venturiello: Aldo Di Santo

References

External links

2006 films
Italian comedy-drama films
2006 comedy-drama films
Films directed by Sergio Rubini
Films scored by Pino Donaggio
2006 comedy films
2006 drama films
2000s Italian films
Fandango (Italian company) films